Albert Peak is a  mountain summit located in British Columbia, Canada.

Description

It is the highest point of the North Duncan Ranges which is a subrange of the Selkirk Mountains. The nearest neighbor is North Albert Peak,  to the immediate northwest. Most precipitation runoff from the mountain drains into tributaries of the nearby Illecillewaet River, whereas the south slope drains to the Akolkolex River. Albert Peak is more notable for its steep rise above local terrain than for its absolute elevation. The peak is visible from Highway 1 (the Trans-Canada Highway) between Revelstoke and Rogers Pass. Despite being an iconic landform near the highway, it is rarely climbed because of rotten rock. The first ascent of the summit was made in 1909 by W. A. Alldritt and G. L. Haggen.

Etymology 
 
The landform was named in 1883 by Principal Grant to honor Albert Luther Rogers (1859–1929), the nephew of Major A. B. Rogers, and his assistant while exploring this area 1881–82 for a Canadian Pacific Railway route through the Selkirk and Rocky Mountains. Albert Rogers was born June 19, 1859, in Waterville, Minnesota, and died May 16, 1929, in Waterville, Washington. He was a civil engineer, civic leader and merchant in Waterville, as well as regent for the University of Washington (1909–1913). The mountain's toponym was officially adopted September 8, 1932, by the Geographical Names Board of Canada.

Climate

Based on the Köppen climate classification, Albert Peak is located in a subarctic climate zone with cold, snowy winters, and mild summers. Winter temperatures can drop below −20 °C with wind chill factors below −30 °C. This climate supports the Albert Glacier on the northeast slope.

See also
 
Geography of British Columbia

References

External links
 Albert Peak: Weather forecast

Three-thousanders of British Columbia
Selkirk Mountains
Columbia Country
Kootenay Land District